Åland is an archipelago in the Baltic Sea, and a self-governing part of Finland.

Åland or Aland may also refer to:
Fasta Åland, the main island in the Åland archipelago
Åland War, part of the Crimean War
Aland (river), a river in Lower Saxony and Saxony-Anhalt, Germany
Aland, Saxony-Anhalt, a municipality in Saxony-Anhalt, Germany
Aland, Karnataka, a town in Karnataka, India
Aland, West Azerbaijan, a village in Iran
Aland Rural District, in West Azerbaijan Province, Iran
Aland (automobile), an automobile from the early 20th century, manufactured in the United States

People with the surname
Barbara Aland  (born 1937), German theologian
Kurt Aland (1915–1994), German theologian
Robert Aland (1836–1904), Australian politician

See also
Aland Bala or Alan-e Olya, a village in Gol Tappeh Rural District, Gol Tappeh District, Kabudarahang County, Hamadan Province, Iran
Aland Pain or Alan-e Sofla, a village in Gol Tappeh Rural District, Gol Tappeh District, Kabudarahang County, Hamadan Province, Iran
Alandi, a town in the Indian state of Maharashtra
Allande, municipality in Spain